Little Timber Creek is a tributary of the Delaware River, in Camden County, New Jersey, United States.

See also
Big Timber Creek

References

Tributaries of the Delaware River
Rivers of Camden County, New Jersey
Rivers of New Jersey